Jānis Skredelis' stadium, formerly Sporta komplekss "Arkādija", is a multi-use stadium in Riga, Latvia. It is currently used mostly for football matches. It used to be the home stadium of Football club RFS. The stadium holds 250 people.

History 
Until  it was called Sporta komplekss "Arkādija", then it was renamed to honor Latvian football manager and sports executive Jānis Skredelis, who had recently died.

References

Football venues in Latvia
FK RFS